Freeway 3, or more commonly known as Tehran-Shomal Freeway (literally: Tehran-North Freeway) will be a freeway in Northern Iran, connecting Tehran to cities of western Mazandaran. Currently, sections 1 & 4 are in service and section 2 is under construction. Construction process at section 3 is not started yet. The freeway runs parallel to Road 59, the old road connecting Karaj to Chalus.

Section 1
This section is from interchange with Azadegan Expressway and Hemmat Expressway in northwestern Tehran city (Municipality District 21) to Doab, Shahrestanak, Alborz Province. This section is opened for test service on February 12, 2020, and officially opened on February 25, 2020. The section is 32 km long, with 28 tunnels having an overall length of 28.4 km on both sides. The longest tunnel is Talun Tunnel which is 4870 m long.

Sections 2 and 3
Section 2 is from Doab, Shahrestanak, Alborz to Pol-e Zanguleh, Kelardasht District, Mazandaran Province. The total length is 25 km. The section has 20 tunnels with overall length of 24.2 km. The longest tunnel is Alborz Tunnel with a  length of 6378 m.
Section 3 is from Pol-e Zanguleh, Kelardasht District, Mazandaran Province to Marzan Abad, Kelardasht District, Mazandaran Province with a length of 46 km. This section will have 92 tunnels with overall length of 33.5 km.
Construction process in section 2 is in progress and is to not be opened till 2021, but progress in section 3 is in the selection phase of contractors and financing.

Section 4
Section 4 is from Marzan Abad, Kelardasht District, Mazandaran Province to Chalus. This section is 20 km long. It has 4 tunnels with an overall length of 1400 m. This section was opened in March 2013.
The AADT of the section is around 16,500.

Direction

References
 Iran Road Maintenance & Transportation Organization
 Road management center of Iran
 Ministry of Roads & Urban Development of Iran 

Freeways in Iran
Transport in Tehran
Transportation in Tehran Province